Gweedore (officially known by its Irish language name) is an Irish-speaking district and parish located on the Atlantic coast of County Donegal in the north-west of Ireland. It is the largest Irish-speaking parish in Ireland with a population of around 4,065, and is also the home of the northwest regional studios of the Irish-language radio service RTÉ Raidió na Gaeltachta, as well as an external campus of National University of Ireland, Galway. Gweedore includes the villages Bunbeg, Derrybeg, Dunlewey, Crolly and Brinlack, and sits in the shade of County Donegal's highest peak, Errigal.

Gweedore is known for being a cradle of Irish culture, with old Irish customs, traditional music, theatre, Gaelic games and the Irish language playing a central and pivotal role in the lives of the local people. This, along with its scenery and many beaches, has made the area a popular tourist destination, especially with visitors from Northern Ireland. Gweedore and the neighbouring districts of Cloughaneely and the Rosses are collectively known locally as "the three parishes"; they form a social and cultural region distinct from the rest of the county, with Gweedore serving as the main centre for socialising and industry.

Etymology

Gweedore is the anglicisation of the original and official Irish name Gaoth Dobhair. Gaoth refers to an inlet of the sea at the mouth of the Crolly River, known as An Ghaoth. It is the boundary between Gweedore to the north and The Rosses to the south. Dobhar is an old Irish word for water. Therefore, Gaoth Dobhair translates as "the aqueous estuary".

The name Gweedore or Gaoth Dobhair refers to the traditional district and Catholic parish of the same name, not to one village or town. The villages of Bunbeg, Derrybeg, Dunlewey and others are collectively known as Gweedore.

Language
Gweedore has a population of 4,500 and is divided into three electoral divisions (EDs):
Machaire Chlochair with a population of 2,651 and an estimated 77% native Irish speakers.
Cnoc Fola/Mín an Chladaigh with a population of 1,326 and 83% Irish speakers.
Dún Lúiche with a population of 695 and 76% Irish speakers.

The predominant spoken language of the district is Irish, but English can be widely heard as well. All schools, religious services, and advertisements are through Irish. Thousands of second-level and some third-level students from all over Ireland attend summer schools at Coláiste Cholmcille (Columba's College), Coláiste Bun an Inbhir, Coláiste Chú Chulainn, Coláiste Mhuire and Coláiste an Phiarsaigh in Gaoth Dobhair every summer to further their knowledge and understanding of the Irish language. This is a Gaeltacht, an area where the Irish language is the first language, providing an unbroken link with millennia of Irish history and culture.

Since most of the inhabitants of the village are bilingual, it is common to hear English vocabulary used within an Irish sentence and vice versa. A rich subset of unique vocabulary and phrases has arisen from this bilingualism and owing to this, the parish has attracted some curious interest from both lexicographers and etymologists in the past. For example, the Irish suffix -ailte or -eáilte is used to form a Gaelicised version of English verbs, as in wreckailte "tired".

History

The Plantation of Ulster in 1609 added a twist to the fate of the parish. Irish-speaking families who were driven from their fertile lands in the Lagan Valley and the surrounding areas made their way to the poor boglands of west Donegal. Some of them made it as far as Gweedore and could go no further west. Around the same time, English and Scottish colonists began to arrive when this uncharted territory was converted to baronies. It appears the parish was very sparsely populated up until the 17th century. The first people to arrive lived on the islands or by the shore in clusters, pockets of houses built close together and in each other's shade. Up until the early 19th century the parish was only lightly populated and it seems the people had an amicable relationship with the landowners.

The standard of life was to deteriorate with the arrival of new landlords in the 19th century, in particular Lord George Hill (1801–1879) and his son Arthur. The people of the parish led by James McFadden, the parish priest in 1875–1901, challenged the landlords with the founding of the Land League and the Plan of Campaign. The killing by locals of Royal Irish Constabulary (RIC) District Inspector William Limbrick Martin outside the local church (Teach Phobail Mhuire) in Derrybeg on Sunday 3 February 1889, while reportedly rushing Father McFadden with a drawn sword, was the climax of the Land War in Gweedore. 43 people were arrested after the killing. The case was recalled in the 1928 memoirs of Tim Healy, who defended Father McFadden and his parishioners.

An Irish American journalist, W.H. Hurlbert, also investigated the landlord-tenant dispute in Gweedore in minute detail in his book Ireland under Coercion, published in 1888.

Many books have been published in Irish, and several in English, detailing Gweedore's rich history. One of the most prolific of local historians was Cáit Nic Giolla Bhríde.

Freak storm
On the afternoon of 23 June 2009, a severe thunderstorm struck Gweedore. It was centred on the adjoining villages of Bunbeg and Derrybeg, and lasted for several hours, causing two rivers to burst their banks, flooding houses, shops and factories, ripping up roads and destroying bridges. Lightning which lasted for two hours damaged power lines and caused a major breakdown of mobile phone service, leaving people trapped by the floods unable to contact help. Up to 20 houses were cut off from the outside world after three access bridges were carried away by the swollen rivers.

Described as the worst storm "in living memory", it was also the most severe since 1880 when five people drowned in Derrybeg.

Economy

In the 1980s and 1990s, Gweedore had a thriving factory industry, where up to 20 large companies were established producing rubber, carpets, body toning equipment and cleaning agents. However, by 2001 most of these companies had closed due to competition from Eastern Europe. Up to 4,000 jobs were lost, and this had a serious economic and social effect on Gweedore and surrounding areas. The factory in the townland of Crolly has been manufacturing porcelain dolls since 1939 under the name Crolly Dolls.

In 2003, the estate was renamed Páirc Ghnó Ghaoth Dobhair (Gweedore Business Park) and the Gaeltacht body, Údarás na Gaeltachta, started a campaign to try to entice businesses to Gweedore in hope of reviving the local economy. A Scottish company opened a call centre on the estate, but this subsequently closed. Other businesses include a number of supermarkets, convenience stores, beauticians, hairdressers, contractors, garages, pharmacists, pubs, cafes and three well-established hotels: Derrybeg Hotel, Teach Jack and An Chúirt Hotel.

Education

Primary level
All five primary schools in the area are Irish-speaking schools. Children are not taught English until higher infants level (5–6 years old).

Scoil Chonaill, Bunbeg (An Bun Beag)
Scoil Mhuire, Derrybeg (Doirí Beaga)
Scoil Phádraig, Dore (Dobhar)
Scoil Bhríde, Mín an Chladaigh
Scoil Adhamhnáin, Lunniagh (Luinneach)

Secondary level
The only community school (post-primary) is Pobalscoil Ghaoth Dobhair, established in Lunniagh in 1977. As with the local primary schools, all students are educated through the medium of Irish and most sit their public examinations in Irish.

Third level
In 2004, NUI Galway expanded to Gweedore when it opened Acadamh na hOllscolaíochta Gaeilge, providing third-level education through the medium of the Irish language to over 80 students every year. Several diplomas are available as well as a new bachelor's degree in business studies.

Physical features
Gweedore is close to Errigal, the tallest mountain in County Donegal, which overshadows the picturesque Dunlewey Lough. It is surrounded by the deep glens and lakes of the Poisoned Glen, through which the Cronaniv Burn flows, and further on, Glenveagh national park and castle, the largest national park in Ireland. Bád Eddie ("Eddie's Boat"), the Cara na Mara ("Friend of the Sea"), is the wreck of a ship which ran ashore on Magheraclogher Strand due to rough seas. The Crolly River (Irish: Abhainn Chroithlí), also known as the Gweedore River, and the Clady River (Irish: An Chláidigh) are two of the main rivers flowing through Gweedore.

The Gweedore coastline consists of long sandy beaches and rugged cliffs with small islands, including Gola Island and Tory Island.

Transport
Gweedore railway station, opened on 9 March 1903, closed for passenger traffic on 3 June 1940 and finally closed altogether on 6 January 1947. The chief railway engineer was Taggart Aston, from Belfast. He was responsible for the design and construction of many of the bridges on the Letterkenny to Burtonport Extension narrow-gauge railway (L&BER), a company jointly owned by the State and the Londonderry and Lough Swilly Railway (L&LSR). Coaches that operate from Gweedore include Collins Coaches Donegal to Glasgow, Feda Ó Dónaill, Coyle's Coaches, John McGinley, Patrick Gallagher Coaches, Crónán Mac Pháidín private hire coaches, and a bus route serving the local airport. For many years the Lough Swilly Railway company provided a bus service for the area, which transported people to places such as Letterkenny and other surrounding parishes.

Sport

Sports played locally include Gaelic football, golf and soccer.

Gaelic games
The local Gaelic games club, CLG Ghaoth Dobhair, is located in Machaire Gathlán and provides facilities for all GAA sports. The Gaoth Dobhair senior team is the most successful club in the Donegal Senior Football Championship and Comórtas Peile na Gaeltachta. It won the 2018 Ulster Senior Club Football Championship. Players such as Kevin Cassidy and the McGee brothers—Eamon and Neil—are known nationally for their exploits with the senior Donegal county football team. Newcomers, such as Odhrán Mac Niallais, Kieran Gillespie, Michael Carroll and Cian Mulligan have secured places in the senior county football team in recent years. Hurling was never a popular sport in Gweedore, with the exception of a briefly successful minor team in the late 1990s.

Golf
Gailf Chumann Ghaoth Dobhair, the local golf club, is also situated in Machaire Gathlán. The 14-hole course hugs the picturesque north-west coast and holds several high-profile tournaments throughout the year, most notably, 'The Clannad Classic', sponsored by the world-renowned local folk band.

Soccer
Soccer clubs active in the area include Gweedore Celtic, Gweedore United, Glenea United and Dunlewey Celtic. All teams take part in both county and national competitions. Scottish soccer player Paddy Crerand's mother hailed from Gweedore. Still a regular visitor to the area, Crerand broadcast an episode of his MUTV show The Paddy Crerand Show live from the Ostan Gweedore Hotel in March 2012. Aiden McGeady's paternal grandparents also hail from Gweedore and he spent many of his summer holidays in the parish.

Currach racing
Cumann na gCurach, based at Machaire Gathlán, is a voluntary group that organises currach races and takes part in numerous races all over the country.

Arts and culture

Music
Gweedore is famed for its traditional Irish music scene, which is prevalent in local taverns, especially at Hiúdaí Beag's Tavern in Bunbeg. Gweedore has produced a number of well-known musicians. Clannad were formed in 1970, and have since gone on to sell over 15 million records. Lead singer Moya Brennan has also enjoyed a successful solo career, providing musical scores for several Hollywood films. Altan (initially Ceoltóirí Altan), another highly successful local band, is led by Coshclady fiddler Mairéad Ní Mhaonaigh. Gweedore's most successful musician is Enya, born as Eithne Ní Bhraonáin; she first appeared on stage in Amharclann Ghaoth Dobhair as a member of Clannad, before going on to become one of the world's biggest-selling artists, with sales exceeding 80 million. Other local singers include Aoife Ní Fhearraigh, Brídín Brennan, Na Casaidigh, Proinsias Ó Maonaigh, Gearóidín Bhreathnach, Seamus McGee and Maria McCool. The well-known 1970s group Skara Brae also had strong links with the district. There are two active choirs in the area. Cór Mhuire Doirí Beaga, led by Baba Brennan and Eileen Nic Suibhne and Cór Thaobh 'a Leithid, led by Doimnic Mac Giolla Bhríde. Both have recorded successful albums.

The song "Gleanntáin Ghlas' Ghaoth Dobhair" was written by local musician Francie Mooney, expressing an exile's final farewell to the green valleys of Gweedore. It has become a modern Irish classic and it has been covered by the likes of Clannad, Paul Brady, Dáithí Sproule, The Johnstons and most notably by Altan. Other well-known songs to have come from the area are "Trasna na dTonnta" and "Báidín Fheilimí".

Festivals

The popular Scoil Gheimhridh Frankie Kennedy ("Frankie Kennedy Winter School") took place in Gweedore every New Year until January 2014 in memory of the eponymous Belfast musician, who was married to its founder, Mairéad Ní Mhaonaigh, until he died of cancer in 1994. It has been replaced by the Scoil Gheimhridh Ghaoth Dobhair ("Gweedore Winter School").

Several attempts have been made recently to revive festivals in the summer months, including Féile Earthcore, Loinneog Lúnasa and Féile Ceoil Ghaoth Dobhair. The annual Saint Patrick's Day Parade which goes from Bunbeg crossroads to Derrybeg attracts thousands of participants and spectators each year.

Theatre
Gweedore has a rich history of theatre and drama productions. The local theatre Amharclann Ghaoth Dobhair was constructed in 1961. A local theatre group known as Aisteoirí Ghaoth Dobhair ('actors of Gweedore') was established in 1932. Their first production was called In Aimsir an Mháirtínigh, an original play by Eoghan Mac Giolla Bhríde which was staged in the parish hall in Derrybeg. Their plays and pantomimes, which were all staged in Irish, became a staple of Gaeltacht social life, drawing audiences from as far as Belfast and they performed throughout Ireland and Scotland. Members of the theatre group have gone on to create TV shows including CU Burn (Seán Mac Fhionnghaile), and have appeared on Ros na Rún (Gavin Ó Fearraigh). Many of Gweedore's musicians were associated with the group. Aisteoirí Ghaoth Dobhair are still active and performed shows at An Grianán Theatre in Letterkenny as part of the Earagail Arts Festival in 2010 and 2011.

Art
Gaoth Dobhair is home to two art galleries which house work by some of the area's best-known painters. An Clachán claims to be the largest art gallery in Donegal, whilst An Gailearaí at Áislann Ghaoth Dobhair has staged exhibitions based on the work of the world-renowned Derek Hill.

Religion

The Roman Catholic parish of Gweedore has four churches: Teach Pobal Mhuire (St Mary's) in Derrybeg (built in 1972, after the previous 'old chapel' had flooded on many occasions), Teach Pobail an Chroí Naofa (Sacred Heart) in Dunlewey (built in 1877), Teach Pobail Naomh Pádraig (St Patrick's) in Meenaweel (built in 1938) and Séipéal Cholmcille (St Columba's) in Bloody Foreland (built in 1933). The only Protestant church in Gweedore is St Patrick's Church of Ireland, in Bunbeg.

Media

Radio

The regional studios of the Irish language radio station RTÉ Raidió na Gaeltachta are in the townland of Derrybeg. Two radio shows are broadcast from Gweedore each day, as well as regional news every hour.

Gallery

Place names in Gweedore
Because Gweedore is in the Gaeltacht and partly due to the provisions of the Official Languages Act 2003, only the original Irish versions of placenames have any legal status, and these are used on road signage. However Anglicised versions were created for most placenames and are still in informal use in English.

Alphabetical listing

 Áit an tSeantí (Attantantee)
 An tArd Donn (Arduns)
 Ard na gCeapairí (Ardnagappery)
 Baile an Droichid (Ballindrait)
 An Baile Láir (Middletown)
 An Bun Beag (Bunbeg)
 Bun an Inbhir (Bunaninver)
 Bun an Leaca (Brinlack or Brinaleck)
 An Charraig (Carrick)
 Carraig an tSeascain (Carrickataskin)
 An Chorrmhín (Corveen)
 Cnoc an Stolaire (Knockastolar)
 Cnoc Fola (Bloody Foreland)
 Coitín or An Choiteann (Cotteen)
 Croichshlí or Croithlí (Crolly)
 Dobhar (Dore)
 Na Doirí Beaga or Doire Beag (Derrybeg)
 Dún Lúiche (Dunlewey)
 Glaise Chú (Glasserchoo)
 An Ghlaisigh (Glassagh)
 Gleann Tornáin (Glentornan)
 Gleann Ualach (Glenhola)
 An Luinnigh (Lunniagh)
 Loch Caol (Loughkeel)
 Machaire Chlochair (Magheraclogher)
 Machaire Gathlán (Magheragallon or Magheragallen)
 Machaire Loisce (Magheralosk)
 Mín an Chladaigh (Meenacladdy)
 Mín a Loch (Meenalough)
 Mín an Iolair (Meenaniller)
 Mín na Cuinge (Meenacuing)
 Mín Uí Bhaoill (Meenaweel)
 Mín Doire Dhaimh (Meenderrygamph)
 Muine Dubh (Meenaduff)
 Na Machaireacha
 Port Uí Chuireáin (Curransport)
 An Rampar
 An Screabán
 An Seascann Beag (Sheskinbeg)
 An Sloitheán (Sleghan)
 Srath Máirtín (Stramartin)
 Srath na Bruaí (Stranabooey)
 Srath na Corcrach (Stranacorkra)
 An Tor (Torr)

Rivers

 Abhainn Chró Nimhe (Cronaniv Burn)
 Abhainn Dhuibhlinne (Devlin River)
 An Chláidigh (Clady River)

Islands
 Gabhla (Gola)
 Inis Meáin (Inishmeane)
 Inis Oirthear (Inishsirrer)
 Inis Sionnaigh (Inishinny)
 Umthoinn (Umpin )
 Toraigh (Tory), although not directly situated off the coast of Gweedore, the main ferry crossings are from the area.

Notable people
The following is a list of notable people from the area:

 Moya Brennan (born 1952) – musician and singer
 Cormac Breslin (1902–1978) – Fianna Fáil TD and Ceann Comhairle
 Kevin Cassidy (born 1981) – Gaelic footballer and All-Star
 Clannad, Grammy Award-winning band
 Vincent Coll (1908–1932) – prohibition-era gangster
 Breandán de Gallaí (born 1969) – former lead dancer with Riverdance
 Pearse Doherty (born 1977) – Sinn Féin TD
 James Duffy (1889–1969) – recipient of the Victoria Cross
 Enya (born 1961) – musician and singer
 Rónán Mac Aodha Bhuí (born 1970) – radio personality
 Seán Mac Fhionnghaile (1952–2009) – actor
 Kevin Gillespie (born 1972) – Catholic Monsignor
 Tarlach Mac Suibhne (1831–1916) – musician
 John McCole (1936–1982) – soccer player; born in Glasgow but buried in Gweedore where his parents were from.
 Na Mooneys, family folk band
 Neil McGee (born 1985) – All-Ireland winning Gaelic footballer and All-Star
 Eamon McGee (born 1984) – All-Ireland winning Gaelic footballer
 Dinny McGinley (born 1945) – former Fine Gael TD. and Minister of State
 Sean McGinley (born 1956) – actor
 Odhrán Mac Niallais (born 1992) – Gaelic footballer
 Francie Mooney (1922–2006) – musician
 Na Casaidigh, traditional Irish band
 Natasha Nic Gairbheith (born 1981) – Miss Ireland 2004
 Aoife Ní Fhearraigh, singer
 Mairéad Ní Mhaonaigh (born 1959) – musician and singer
 Patrick O'Donnell (1835–1883) – Irish Republican
 Gavin Ó Fearraigh (born 1980) – actor/model
 Bríd Rodgers (born 1935) – SDLP politician, Member of the Legislative Assembly for Upper Bann.

See also
 List of towns and villages in Ireland
 Teach Mhicí

Notes

References

External links
 Gaothdobhair.ie. Official website for Gweedore by the Gweedore Tourist & Traders Community group
 Gaothdobhair.ie. English Version of Official Gweedore Website
 Gweedore.net – Your Guide to Gaoth Dobhair ... The Heart and Soul of Donegal 
 County Donegal.net & Dún na nGall.com – Gaoth Dobhair/Gweedore
Gweedore pop stats 2006
Wild Atlantic Gweedore – Website promoting the beauty and history of Gweedore

 
Gaeltacht places in County Donegal
Gaeltacht towns and villages
Geography of County Donegal 
Townlands of County Donegal
Towns and villages in County Donegal